Kemujan Island (Indonesian: Pulau Kemujan) is an island in the Karimunjawa Islands of Indonesia. It is administered as part of the Jepara Regency, Central Java. Kemujan is the second largest of the Karinmunjawas, and is less forested than the larger Karimun Island. The island is serviced by Dewadaru Airport.

The economy of the island is based around fishing and tourism. Kemujan island also contains rare, naturally-exposed iron ore deposits.

References 
 

Java Sea
Greater Sunda Islands
Islands of Central Java
Islands of the Java Sea